Yenikent Tunnel, is a highway tunnel constructed in Sinop Province, northern Turkey.

Yenikent Tunnel is part of the Sinop-Samsun Highway  within the Black Sea Coastal Highway, of which construction was carried out by the Turkish Cengiz Construction Company. The -long twin-tube tunnel carrying two lanes of traffic in each direction. The Gerze Tunnel follows the Yenikent Tunnel in direction Sinop. 

The tunnel was opened to traffic on 14 December 2012 by Turkish Minister of Transport, Maritime and Communication Binali Yıldırım.

References

External links
 Map of road tunnels in Turkey at General Directorate of Highways (Turkey) (KGM)

Road tunnels in Turkey
Transport in Sinop Province
Tunnels completed in 2012